Henry Kalunga (date of birth unknown, died 1994) was a Zambian boxer. He competed in the men's welterweight event at the 1984 Summer Olympics.

References

Year of birth missing
1994 deaths
Zambian male boxers
Olympic boxers of Zambia
Boxers at the 1984 Summer Olympics
Place of birth missing
Welterweight boxers